Carta de Cuba (Letter from Cuba) is an international magazine featuring work by independent Cuban journalists . The director of the publication is Jose Rivero Garcia, one of the leading Cuban dissident intellectuals during the 1980s and 1990s. The magazine was founded in 1995 in Puerto Rico by Cuban writer, poet, journalist, art critic, and political activist Carlos Franqui, in collaboration with Andres Candelario, a sociologist, and Mario I. Garcia, a political activist.

External links

Carta de Cuba homepage

Opposition to Fidel Castro
Newspapers published in Cuba